
Jelena Jensen (born October 7, 1981) is an American pornographic film actress, nude model, and webcam model.

Early life
Jensen was born in Los Angeles, California. She is of German descent. She attended Chapman University in Orange County, California and graduated in May 2003 with a Bachelor of Fine Arts in film and television production. Jensen had her start in the porn industry while in college, as a product and marketing manager for an adult DVD retail website.

Career
Jensen had her first photo shoot with Scott St. James, which was published in the August 2003 edition of Club magazine. Since then she has worked with many photographers, including Suze Randall, Holly Randall, and Ken Marcus; and with directors such as Andrew Blake and Bunny Luv. Originally only a "softcore" actress, in 2009 she began performing hardcore penetrative scenes for her website.

Jensen has appeared in Playboy, Penthouse, and Hustler. She had a recurring role in Digital Playground's Jack's Playground series, hosted Playboy TV's Totally Busted, and had a cameo appearance in the dark comedy–horror film Bad Biology (2010).
, Jensen runs her own website, manages other performers' sites, and hosts the Vivid Radio show The J Spot.

Awards
 2010 XBIZ Award – Web Babe of the Year
 2013 AVN Award – Best Solo Girl Website
 2020 AVN Hall of Fame

References

External links

 
 
 
 

1981 births
Actresses from Los Angeles
American female adult models
American pornographic film actresses
American people of German descent
Chapman University alumni
Living people
Penthouse Pets
Pornographic film actors from California
Webcam models
21st-century American women